Petracola pajatensis is a species of lizard in the family Gymnophthalmidae. It is endemic to Peru.

References

Petracola
Reptiles of Peru
Endemic fauna of Peru
Reptiles described in 2020
Taxa named by Luis Mamani